Chailey Moat is a Grade II listed building near the village of Chailey, East Sussex. It is a 16th-century moated two storey house with an 18th-century facade. It is a former rectory with 45 1/2 acres of gardens and other land.

References

Grade II listed buildings in East Sussex
Lewes District
Clergy houses in England
Grade II listed houses
Houses in East Sussex